The 2018 World Fencing Championships was held from 19 to 27 July at 2018 in Wuxi, China.

Host selection
On 23 November 2015, Wuxi beat the Japanese city of Fukuoka with 69 votes to 47.

Schedule
Twelve events were held.

All times are local (UTC+8).

Medal summary

Medal table

Men's events

Women's events

References

External links
Official website

 
2018
World Championships
2018 in Chinese sport
Sport in Wuxi
World Championships, 2018
July 2018 sports events in China